Erős Pista (Strong Steve) is the  most popular chili sauce in Hungary. Erős Pista is made from coarsely minced hot paprika and salt; containing nothing more perishable, it can be stored for a year in a refrigerator. It is also produced in a paste form.

Usage
Hungarians use Erős Pista for example in Lecsó (a vegetable ragout), csirkepaprikás (chicken paprikash) and soups like halászlé (fisherman's soup) and gulyás (goulash).

See also
 Hungarian cuisine

References

Chili sauce and paste
Hungarian cuisine